Kenneth Clay Gattison (born May 23, 1964) is an American former professional basketball player and National Basketball Association (NBA) assistant coach.

High school and college
Born in Wilmington, North Carolina, Gattison grew up playing basketball at the park with Michael Jordan. He attended New Hanover High School, where he competed against Jordan, and defeated his team in the high school state championship. Gattison went to college at Old Dominion University, where he was a two-time honorable mention All-American. He is the Sun Belt Conference's all-time rebound leader with 963 recoveries, and ranks fourth all-time at ODU. His 1,623 career points ranks him 11th all-time in ODU history.

Kenny performed 34 double-doubles and had 87 double figure games. Gattison competed in the 1983 National Sports Festival in Colorado Springs for the East Squad. He also was selected to the U.S. Junior World Cup team in 1983. Gattison averaged 16.1 points per game for ODU in 1985 and
17.4 points per game in 1986. He helped lead ODU to two straight NCAA tournament bids and in his senior year of 1986, the eighth seeded Monarchs defeated West Virginia for ODU's first ever NCAA Division I Tournament win. That same year, Gattison shot .637 (218–342) from the field.

Gattison was named honorable mention All-American by the Associated Press in 1985 and 1986. He was named the Sun Belt Conference Player of the Year in 1986, and was later named to the Sun Belt Conference's All-Decade team. The ODU Alumni Association named Gattison as the 1986 Male Athlete of the Year. Gattison graduated from Old Dominion with a degree in distributive education, specializing in personnel management.  In April 1991, Gattison was inducted into the ODU Sports Hall of Fame. In 1992 his #44 jersey at ODU was retired. In 2004 New Hanover High School named the basketball court in his name and on Feb. 8, 2013 Gattison was inducted into the Greater Wilmington Area Sports Hall of Fame.

Professional career
Gattison was selected by the Phoenix Suns in the 3rd round (55th overall) of the 1986 NBA draft. A 6'8" forward-center, he in nine NBA seasons for 3 different teams. He played for the Phoenix Suns (1986–87, 1988), Charlotte Hornets (1989–95) and Vancouver Grizzlies (1995–96). On February 22, 1996 he was traded by the Grizzlies to the Orlando Magic, and on August 9, 1996 the Magic traded him to Utah Jazz, but he did not appear in any games for those teams.

In his NBA career, Gattison played in 494 games and scored a total of 3,923 points. His best season as a professional came during the 1991–92 NBA season as a member of the Hornets, appearing in 82 games (71 starts) and averaging 12.7 points and 7.1 rebounds per game. Gattison's 0.529 career field goal percentage with the Charlotte Hornets is the best in the franchise history.

Coaching career
After retiring, Gattison served as an assistant coach on John Calipari's staff with the New Jersey Nets from 1996–98. He then returned to his alma mater, Old Dominion in 2001 as an assistant coach until 2003 when he was named assistant coach with his former team, the New Orleans (former Charlotte) Hornets. He remained with New Orleans until June 2009.

On July 28, 2010, Gattison was named an assistant coach to the Atlanta Hawks under head coach Larry Drew.

On June 25, 2013, Gattison was named an assistant coach to the Phoenix Suns under former teammate and current head coach Jeff Hornacek.

On May 29, 2015, Gattison's two-year tenure on the Suns staff ended as he was informed that his contract, set to expire June 30, would not be renewed.

On September 28, 2016 Gattison was named Vice President of membership and Player Programming for the National Basketball Retired Players Association (NBRPA), the official alumni organization for former players from the NBA, ABA, WNBA and Harlem Globetrotters.

References

1964 births
Living people
20th-century African-American sportspeople
21st-century African-American people
African-American basketball coaches
African-American basketball players
American expatriate basketball people in Canada
American expatriate basketball people in Italy
American men's basketball coaches
American men's basketball players
Atlanta Hawks assistant coaches
Basketball coaches from North Carolina
Basketball players from North Carolina
Centers (basketball)
Charlotte Hornets players
New Hanover High School alumni
New Jersey Nets assistant coaches
New Orleans Hornets assistant coaches
Old Dominion Monarchs men's basketball coaches
Old Dominion Monarchs men's basketball players
Phoenix Suns assistant coaches
Phoenix Suns draft picks
Phoenix Suns players
Power forwards (basketball)
Quad City Thunder players
Vancouver Grizzlies expansion draft picks
Vancouver Grizzlies players